Centre Avenue is one of two railroad stations of the Long Island Rail Road in East Rockaway, New York. The station is officially located at Forest Avenue between Rocklyn and Centre Avenues, one block east of Atlantic Avenue.

History
The station was opened in 1898 by the New York and Long Beach Railroad and originally was known as South Lynbrook station until 1924. 

Centre Avenue station was originally located a block to the west and had a station house, but was moved east when high-level platforms were installed in the late 1960s in order to facilitate the new M1 railcars. Parts of the original platform are still visible along the trackside towards Lynbrook. The station's parking lot is adjacent to the site of the former station.

Station layout
This station has two high-level wheelchair-accessible side platforms, each 10 cars long, with shelters and ticket vending machines. 

Parking is available for vehicles with East Rockaway village residential permits and is located one block west, near the site of the former station. Limited non-resident parking is also available.

References

External links 

Unofficial LIRR History Website
February 1999 Photo Looking south
December 2006 @ Grade Crossing
December 2006 Looking South
 Station from Centre Avenue from Google Maps Street View
Platforms from Google Maps Street View

Long Island Rail Road stations in Nassau County, New York
Railway stations in the United States opened in 1898
1898 establishments in New York (state)